Gabriello Carnazza (1871–1931) was an Italian lawyer and politician who was the minister of public works in the first cabinet of Benito Mussolini.

Biography
Carnazza was born in 1871. He hailed from a Sicilian family. He was a lawyer by profession. He had a liberal political stance before joining the National Fascist Party in the early 1920s. 

Carnazza was appointed minister of public works in the first cabinet of Benito Mussolini in 1922. During his term a law on the classification and maintenance of public roads dated 15 November 1923 was put into force which has been called the "Carnazza decree" or "Carnazza law". He died in 1931.

References

External links

19th-century Italian lawyers
20th-century Italian lawyers
1871 births
1931 deaths
Italian Ministers of Public Works
National Fascist Party politicians
Mussolini Cabinet